The Best in Mystery is an American anthology and mystery television series  that ran for three years as a summer replacement series for the  crime drama The Big Story.  

The series aired on NBC from July 16, 1954, to September 3, 1954, presenting eight episodes on Friday nights from 9 to 9:30 p.m., from July 1955 to September 1955, and from July 13, 1956, to August 31, 1956. The 1955 broadcasts featured MCA-TV productions, most of which had been broadcast on The Pepsi-Cola Playhouse or Studio 57. Episodes aired in 1956 featured Dick Powell as Willie Dante, owner of the San Francisco night club Dante's Inferno. They were first broadcast as part of Four Star Playhouse on CBS.

The program was sponsored on alternate weeks by Simoniz and American Tobacco Company, with American Tobacco and the Toni Company alternating in 1956.

Guest stars

Agnes Moorehead 
Tom Drake
Elizabeth Patterson
Harry Harvey, Jr.
Ross Elliott
Mary Field
Lloyd Corrigan
Jay Novello
George Nader
Carolyn Jones
Fay Roope
Lynne Roberts
Morris Ankrum
Kim Spalding
Marilyn Erskine

Episodes

Lullabye - July 16, 1954
Lost Kid - July 23, 1954
Death Makes a Pass - July 30, 1954
Account Closed - August 6, 1954
The Watchers and the Watched - August 13, 1954
Frozen Escape - August 20, 1954
Death Has No System - August 27, 1954
Victim Ann Norville - September 3, 1954

References

External links
The Best in Mystery at ctva.biz

1954 American television series debuts
1954 American television series endings
1950s American crime television series
1950s American anthology television series
English-language television shows
NBC original programming